JumpStation was the first WWW search engine that behaved, and appeared to the user, the way current web search engines do. It started indexing on 12 December 1993 and was announced on the Mosaic "What's New" webpage on 21 December 1993. It was hosted at the University of Stirling in Scotland.

It was written by Jonathon Fletcher, from Scarborough, England, who graduated from the University with a first class honours degree in Computing Science in the summer of 1992 and has subsequently been named "father of the search engine".

He was subsequently employed there as a systems administrator. JumpStation's development discontinued when he left the University in late 1994, having failed to get any investors, including the University of Stirling, to financially back his idea. At this point the database had 275,000 entries spanning 1,500 servers.

JumpStation used document titles and headings to index the web pages found using a simple linear search, and did not provide any ranking of results. However, JumpStation had the same basic shape as Google Search in that it used an index solely built by a web robot, searched this index using keyword queries entered by the user on a web form whose location was well-known, and presented its results in the form of a list of URLs that matched those keywords.

Nominations 
JumpStation was nominated for a "Best Of The Web" award in 1994 and the story of its origin and development written up, using interviews with Fletcher, by Wishart and Bochsler.

See also
Aliweb
WebCrawler
World Wide Web Worm
Excite

References 

Internet search engines
People from Scarborough, North Yorkshire
People associated with the University of Stirling